Gol-e Aliabad (also Romanized as Gol-e ‘Alīābād and Golalīābād) is a village in Baladeh Rural District, Khorramabad District, Tonekabon County, Mazandaran Province, Iran. At the 2006 census, its population was 712, in 204 families.

References 

Populated places in Tonekabon County